John Wang (born 10 October 1962) is a Taiwanese politician. A member of the Taiwan Solidarity Union, he served one term on the Legislative Yuan, representing overseas Chinese between 2002 and 2005.

Early life
John Wang's father  was the founding leader of the Taiwanese American Foundation. John Wang was raised in the United States and earned his bachelor's degree from the University of Southern California.

Career
As a legislator, Wang took an interest in foreign affairs, and took several trips abroad. He traveled to the United States to discuss Taiwan's inclusion in the World Trade Organization and the aftermath of the 2003 invasion of Iraq. Wang also visited Switzerland to advocate for Taiwan's inclusion in the World Health Assembly. Within the Legislative Yuan, Wang took active roles in the Taiwan–USA Parliamentary Amity Association, and the Taiwan–France Parliamentary Amity Association. In September 2002, the legislature issued a non-binding resolution against the use of foreign languages during interpellation, shortly after Wang had questioned Premier Yu Shyi-kun in English.

References

1962 births
Living people
Members of the 5th Legislative Yuan
Party List Members of the Legislative Yuan
Taiwan Solidarity Union Members of the Legislative Yuan
University of Southern California alumni
Taiwanese expatriates in the United States